State Route 397 (SR 397) is a state highway in the U.S. state of Nevada. It runs from State Route 860 near Derby Field east on Westergard Road and north on Meridian Road into Lovelock. After passing under Interstate 80/U.S. Route 95, it turns northeast on Amherst Avenue and ends at State Route 398, two blocks southeast of State Route 396 (old U.S. Route 40).

History
Until the 1976 renumbering, most of SR 397 was State Route 59, defined by 1937. At one point, SR 397 only used Westergard Road east of Westfall Road, turning north there to return to I-80/US 95 at Perth. Later, possibly when SR 860 was added, Westfall Road was dropped and SR 397 was extended west to meet SR 860.

Major intersections

See also

References

397
Transportation in Pershing County, Nevada
1397